Julie Rösch (23 October 1902 – 13 May 1984) was a German politician of the Christian Democratic Union (CDU) and former member of the German Bundestag.

Life 
Rösch was a member of the German Bundestag from its first election in 1949 to 1961. From 1949 to 1953, she had entered parliament via the state list of the CDU Württemberg-Hohenzollern and from 1953 to 1961 via the state list of the CDU Baden-Württemberg.

Literature

References

1902 births
1984 deaths
Members of the Bundestag for Baden-Württemberg
Members of the Bundestag 1957–1961
Members of the Bundestag 1953–1957
Members of the Bundestag 1949–1953
Female members of the Bundestag
20th-century German women politicians
Members of the Bundestag for the Christian Democratic Union of Germany
Officers Crosses of the Order of Merit of the Federal Republic of Germany
Recipients of the Order of Merit of Baden-Württemberg